The State Register of Heritage Places is maintained by the Heritage Council of Western Australia. , 423 places are heritage-listed in the City of Vincent, of which 63 are on the State Register of Heritage Places.

List
The Western Australian State Register of Heritage Places, lists the following 63 state registered places within the City of Vincent:

References

Vincent